Ervin Bulku (born 3 March 1981) is an Albanian former professional footballer and current caretaker manager of the Albania national team.

He was a utility player and played in many positions such as central midfielder, defensive midfielder, right midfielder and even right back for the Albania national team between 2002 and 2015 and in the club level with Tirana where he started and ended his career after playing for various club outside such as Kryvbas in Ukraine, Hajduk Split in Croatia, AZAL Baku in Azerbaijan and Sepahan in Iran.

Early life
Bulku was born in Tirana, Albania. He was the second son of the family after Sokol Bulku also a former KF Tirana's footballer with whom he played there between 1998–2004 and the later is current manager of KF Tirana under 19s Squad.

Club career

KF Tirana

Bulku started his career as a youngster in the KF Tirana youth teams. At the age of 18 he was put into the first team by coach Sulejman Mema and was given a chance to compete with the likes of Sokol Prenga and Ardian Mema for a spot there. In his first season with the club in professional football he managed to feature in 13 games during the season. During the 1999–2000 season with Tirana, Bulku found it easier to make an impact in the first team with the club's new manager Shkëlqim Muça having faith in the promising youngster after fellow midfielders Eldorado Merkoçi, Devis Mukaj, Klodian Duro and Sokol Prenga all leaving the club. These departures meant that Bulku would feature more frequently in the first team and he did so making an impressive 21 appearances in his second season in which he won his first trophy of his career, the Albanian Superliga title. After a very good season he tried to repeat it for the 2000–2001 season, but this did not happen as both injury and some mediocre displays meant that Bulku spent most of the season on the side lines. He did however manage to win the Albanian Supercup at the start of the season but his side Tirana narrowly lost the race for the title to Vllaznia Shkodër. During the next few seasons of his career Bulku managed to make a name for himself in the squad and in the league, he was receiving a lot of attention from the media and the fans because he was destined for a successful career. He began to feature in almost every game when fit and became a key member in the squad and a key figure in all the trophy winning sides that the club produced over the next few years. In the 2001–02 season he was a regular member of the team in the 2001–02 Albanian Cup scoring two goals throughout the route to the final where Tirana won the trophy beating Dinamo Tirana 1–0. Bulku was also a key player in Tirana's European games and featured against teams such as Dinamo Tbilisi, Ferencváros, CSKA Sofia and Kayserispor. He also played in 6 Albanian Supercup finals during his time with Tirana, winning 5 of them, including the famous 6–0 win over city rivals Dinamo Tirana in which Bulku managed to score in. In his final season with Tirana, Bulku was once again a key member in the team that won the league, the cup and the supercup. He played 30 games and scored one goal in the league, played in the 2–0 supercup win over KS Elbasani and he also played in 1–0 win over Vllaznia in the final of the Albanian Cup.

Kryvbas
In the 2007 Summer transfer window, Bulku signed with Kryvbas Kryvyi Rih in the Ukrainian Premier League. He played among fellow Albanian internationals Dorian Bylykbashi, Isli Hidi and also Ansi Agolli who eventually joined the club two years later.
He made his debut on 28 July 2007 in the matchday 3 against Karpaty Lviv playing the full 90-minutes in a 3–0 loss. During the 2007–08 route he was often as a starter under coach Oleh Taran forming partnerships in the midfield with fellow Albanian Dorian Bylykbashi, Ruslan Kostyshyn and Anatoliy Oprya.
He made 14 league appearances in the starting line up and 5 as a substitute to help his side to collect 30 points enough to end in the 13th place to avoid the relegation.

In his second season 2008–09 under same coach Taran, Bulku was more often in the starting line up. He started the season on 19 July 2008, playing full 90-minutes against Metalurh Zaporizhya and provided the assist for the 1–0 winning goal. Bulku scored his first goal for Kryvbas on 22 March 2009 in the matchday 21 against Kharkiv, giving his team the 0–1 victory. This was followed by another one in the next game week as Bulku scored the opening goal in the 7th minute against Zorya Luhansk on 4 April 2009 as the match eventually finished in the 2–1 victory. Bulku finished the 2008–09 season with a total of 25 appearances, where he was 21 times as a starter as Kryvbas ended up a bit better than last season collecting 32 points to secure the 12th place.

Bulku was part of the team for the first half of the 2009–10 season. He retained his starting place playing 13 out 14 games as a starter but Kryvbas suffered a worst progress taking only two wins and 1 draw and conceding 14 losses. Following the end of the first-half campaign, he interrupted his contract with Kryvbas.

Hajduk Split
After 6 months as a free agent, in August 2010 he signed for Croatian side Hajduk Split in the Prva HNL. He made his debut with the team on 16 September 2010 in a match valid for 2010–11 UEFA Europa League group stage against AEK Athens, where Bulku played in the starting line up and substituted off after 81 minutes for Dinko Trebotić, as the match finished in the 3–1 loss.
He made it his league debut on 19 September 2010 against Rijeka, where the match finished in the 0–1 away victory and Bulku played 83 minutes, as he got substituted off for Mirko Oremuš in the 83rd minute. He played second match in the UEFA Europa League 2010–11 group stage on 30 September 2010, in the 1–0 victory over Anderlecht.
Bulku played the full 90 minutes on 4 November 2010 in the 2–3 home defeat against Zenit St. Petersburg in the UEFA Europa League 2010–11 group stage. At the club he was important part of the starting line up in the league matches, as he played in total of 15 matches where 12 as a starter, where he got substituted off 6 times, and only 3 as a substitute. In the UEFA Europa League he made in total 4 appearances. In the end of the 2010–11 season, Hajduk finished as runners-up.

AZAL
At the end of June 2011 Bulku signed with AZAL of the Azerbaijan Premier League. Bulku made his debut for AZAL on 7 August 2011 against Simurq, going on to score his first goal for the club 3 games later against Neftchi Baku on 27 August 2011. In total Bulku made 22 league appearances for the club scoring three goals.

Sepahan
On 21 July 2012, Bulku signed a one-year contract with Iranian champions Sepahan F.C., joining there another fellow Albanian player Xhevahir Sukaj, who had come in the team early on January.

He made it his debut on 29 August 2012, playing the full 90-minutes in the home victory 1–0 against Fajr Sepasi. Bulku scored his first goal for Sepahan on 6 April 2013 against Naft Tehran winning the match within the 3–1 result, were his goal was the opening of the match, scored in the 12th minute, also Bulku was sent off in the 41st minute after receiving his second yellow card as the first was received in the 12th minute for taking his shirt off after scored the goal.
In his first season with Sepahan, he made twenty-one league appearances, scoring once. He also appeared five AFC Champions League matches.

In his second season with Sepahan, he made twenty six league appearances, failing to score. He did score once in the AFC Champions League, but Sepahan failed to get out of the group stage phase. In the 2012–13 Hazfi Cup Bulku scored once in the 1/4-finals on 9 January 2013 against Sanat Naft to open the way towards qualifying for the semifinals as the match finished in the 2–0 victory.

In May 2014, Bulku declared that he left the club after the end of the 2-year contract.

Return to Tirana
On 5 June 2014, Tirana announced to have acquired Bulku as a free agent, with the veteran marking his return to the club after seven years. Nine days later, the transfer was made official and Bulku signed a two-year contract. However, he joined the team managed by Gugash Magani on 1 July when the summer transfer window officially begun. In August, team captain Erando Karabeci handed his captaincy to Bulku as a sign of respect of the veteran, and became the vice-captain instead.

Bulku made his first appearance of the season on 24 August, playing full-90 minutes in the opening championship match against Apolonia Fier, which ended in a 3–0 win at Qemal Stafa Stadium. He scored his first goal of the season on day three, netting a last-minute equalizer in a 1–1 away draw against Vllaznia Shkodër which was infamously marred by crowd trouble which saw 13 people arrested and both clubs' fans receiving lengthy stadium bans.

He concluded his first season back in Albania by making 32 appearances between league and cup, also scoring once. Bulku played as a starter in Tirana's first three matches of 2015–16 season, but was injured and subsequently lost his place in the starting lineup, finishing his second season with only four league appearances.

International career

Albania U18 
Bulku made it his first international debut, with Albania national under-18 football team in the 1999 UEFA European Under-18 Championship qualifying, playing in the opening match on 24 November 1998 against Liechtenstein, match finished as a 0–1 loss.

Albania U21 
Bulku played for Albania national under-21 football team 15 matches and scored 1 goal in the 2000 & 2002 UEFA European Under-21 Championship qualification between years from 1999 to 2002.

Albania senior team

Bulku was part of Albania national football team since 2002 when he made his debut under coach Sulejman Demollari on 17 April 2002 against Andorra, coming on as a substitute in place of Altin Rraklli in the 54th minute in a 2–0 loss. He made another 2 appearances in the same year.

UEFA Euro 2008 qualifying
He wasn't included in national team until 2006 when he was called up by coach Otto Barić for the UEFA Euro 2008 qualifying match against Netherlands on 11 October.

His next appearance for Albania came in 2007 playing on 7 February in a friendly against Macedonia, finished in the loss 0–1.

2010 FIFA World Cup qualification

UEFA Euro 2012 qualifying 
He scored first goal on 9 February 2011 in the friendly match against Slovenia finished in the loss 1–2, where Bulku scored the equalising goal for 1–1 in the 62nd minute.

2014 FIFA World Cup qualification
Bulku retained his starting place for the 2014 FIFA World Cup qualifiers under coach Gianni De Biasi playing 9 out 10 matches as a starter. In the 2012s matches he formed a duo defensive-midfielders partnership with Burim Kukeli playing all 4 matches as the full 90-minutes with Albania taking 2 wins and 2 losses. Then he played two full 90-minutes matches against Norway away on 22 March 2013 and home on 7 June 2013 with a new partner Migjen Basha and provided 1 assist in both cases for Hamdi Salihi's goal away which was decisive for Albania taking the 0–1 glorious victory and for Valdet Rama's goal in home in the 1–1 draw. In remaining matches Bulku played one full 90-minutes match, 2 as a starter until second half and 1 as a substitute against Iceland as coach De Biasi played with Basha and new Ergys Kaçe as a starter and Bulku replaced Basha in the 64th minute with Albania 2–1 behind but unable to change the score. For his performances during the qualifiers, Bulku among Mërgim Mavraj were rated as impenetrable and very actives on the field.

Euro 2016 qualifiers
During the UEFA Euro 2016 qualifying under same coach De Biasi, Bulku was regularly called up into the national side, except for the two closing matches in October 2015 but however he participated in just one match vs Armenia on 29 March 2015, this due to upcomings of fellow defensive midfielders from Switzerland national under-21 football team such as Taulant Xhaka, Amir Abrashi, Migjen Basha and also the presence of experienced and younger players Burim Kukeli, Ledian Memushaj and Ergys Kaçe.

Managerial career
In November 2015 Bulku was appointed as assistant manager of Gianni De Biasi at the Albania national football team becoming the third one after Paolo Tramezzani and Erjon Bogdani. He debuted in his assistant manager role on 17 November 2015 against Georgia. He participated with Albania in their first major competition the UEFA Euro 2016.

On 23 March 2019, following the sacking of Albania national team head coach Christian Panucci after the 2–0 home defeat to Turkey in the opening day of UEFA Euro 2020 qualifying campaign, Bulku was announced as the caretaker manager with Sulejman Mema as his assistant for the second match against Andorra two days later. In the match played at Estadi Nacional, Albania won comfortably 3–0; two of the goals were scored by Bekim Balaj and Amir Abrashi, who were brought on by Bulku as substitutions.

Career statistics

Club

International

International goals
. Albania U18 score listed first, score column indicates score after each Bulku's goal.

. Albania U21 score listed first, score column indicates score after each Bulku's goal.

. Albania score listed first, score column indicates score after each Bulku's goal.

Honours

Club
Tirana
Albanian Superliga: 1998–1999, 1999–2000, 2002–2003, 2003–2004, 2004–2005, 2006–2007
Albanian Cup: 1998–99, 2000–01, 2001–02, 2005–06
Albanian Supercup: 2000, 2002, 2003, 2005, 2006, 2007

Hajduk Split
Prva HNL runner-up: 2010–11

Sepahan
Hazfi Cup: 2012–13

References

External links

1981 births
Living people
Footballers from Tirana
Albanian footballers
Association football midfielders
Association football defenders
Albania international footballers
Albania under-21 international footballers
Albania youth international footballers
KF Tirana players
FC Kryvbas Kryvyi Rih players
HNK Hajduk Split players
AZAL PFK players
Sepahan S.C. footballers
Ukrainian Premier League players
Croatian Football League players
Azerbaijan Premier League players
Persian Gulf Pro League players
Kategoria Superiore players
Albanian expatriate footballers
Expatriate footballers in Ukraine
Albanian expatriate sportspeople in Ukraine
Expatriate footballers in Croatia
Albanian expatriate sportspeople in Croatia
Expatriate footballers in Azerbaijan
Albanian expatriate sportspeople in Azerbaijan
Expatriate footballers in Iran
Albanian expatriate sportspeople in Iran